Jovanka Kalić (born in Belgrade on 15 September 1933) is a Serbian historian, university professor and member of the Serbian Academy of Sciences and Arts.

Biography
She graduated from the University of Belgrade Faculty of Philosophy history department in 1956. Kalić started her research work during her studies. Between 1958 and 1961 she worked as an assistant at the Institute of History in Belgrade. In 1961, she started to work as a lecturer at the University of Belgrade Faculty of Philosophy and in 1964, she earned her PhD on the topic of the medieval history of Belgrade. In 1970, she became assistant professor and in 1976, full-time professor at the University of Belgrade. After the death of Ivan Božić, she was elected as the chair of the Department of General History. The International Committee of Historical Sciences granted her a project on Byzantine history, in the section on Byzantine history in Yugoslavia.

Kalić participated in numerous scientific conferences and held guest lectures at numerous universities including Stanford University, University of California, Santa Barbara, and Los Angeles, University of Warsaw, Salento, Augsburg, Münster, Graz and Vienna. 

While married, she used an additional surname, and was known as Jovanka Kalić-Mijušković (Јованка Калић-Мијушковић).

Awards and honours
 In 1994, she became a member of the Serbian Academy of Sciences and Arts. 
 In 1964 and 1971, she received the City of Belgrade October Award.

Selected works

References

1933 births
Living people
20th-century Serbian historians
Members of the Serbian Academy of Sciences and Arts
20th-century Serbian women writers
21st-century Serbian historians